Vidumelon is a genus of air-breathing land snails, terrestrial pulmonate gastropod mollusks in the family Camaenidae.

Species
Species within the genus Vidumelon include:
 Vidumelon wattii

References

 
Camaenidae
Taxonomy articles created by Polbot